Alfred (Fred) Flatow (born 28 August 1937 in Berlin) is an Australian chess FIDE Master and former Australian Chess Champion.

Flatow was born in Germany and emigrated to Australia. He was City of Sydney Champion eleven times (1963, 1967, 1968 (jointly), 1969, 1970, 1972, 1975 (jointly), 1981 (jointly), 1982, 1983, and 1985), and won the Australian Chess Championship in Sydney 1969/70. He also twice won the Doeberl Cup in Canberra in 1970 (jointly) and 1972.

He twice played for Australia in Chess Olympiads (Lugano 1968 and Skopje 1972).

References

External links

"Grim Battles in Junior Chess Tourney", Sydney Morning Herald, 29 August 1950, p. 2

1937 births
Living people
German chess players
Australian chess players
Chess FIDE Masters
Chess Olympiad competitors